In the run–up to the 1955 general election, various polling organisations conducted opinion polling to gauge voting intention amongst the general public. Such polls, dating from the previous election in 1955 to polling day on 26 May 1955, are listed in this article.

Graphical summaries

Polling results 

In the run–up to the 1955 United Kingdom general elections, various organisations carry out opinion polling to gauge voting intention. Results of such polls are displayed in this article.

The date range for these opinion polls are from the 1951 general election until the 1955 general election.

All polling data is from PollBase

1955

1954

1953

1952

1951

References 

Opinion polling for United Kingdom general elections